The Good Wife (グッドワイフ) is a Japanese television drama series starring Takako Tokiwa, Kotaro Koizumi, Kiko Mizuhara, Takumi Kitamura, and Kika Kobayashi. It is a Japanese remake of the American television series of the same title which aired on CBS from 2009 to 2016. It aired on TBS from January 13 to March 17, 2019 on Sundays 21:00 hrs.

References

Nichiyō Gekijō
2019 Japanese television series debuts
2019 Japanese television series endings
Japanese-language television shows
Japanese legal television series
Japanese television series based on American television series
The Good Wife